The Provisional Electoral Council (French: Conseil Électoral Provisoire, CEP; Haitian Creole: Konsèy Elektoral Pwovizwa) was the electoral commission of Haiti.  The body had the sole agency responsible for presidential elections and parliamentary elections. CEP used to be Haiti's main and only legal election agency.

It was dissolved in September 2021 by acting Prime Minister Ariel Henry.

Mandate 
As the sole legal electoral body in Haiti, CEP's responsibilities included the following:

 Ensuring confidence building among key actors involved in the electoral process;
 Establish the balance between the various political players in the race, hence the role of arbiter.
 Organize and supervise elections.
 Enforce the election legislation throughout the national territory.
 Ensure elections are held freely, credibly and transparently.
 Intervening in the mobilization and coordination of activities related to electoral information.
 Provide input in developing the legal framework for the electoral process.

Criticism 
More than 30 presidential candidates reproached CEP for its obscure scrutiny policies and censured CEP for its lack of transparency. According to Haitian Sentinel, CEP rejected transparency request by some presidential candidates including Jude Célestin, runoff candidate for the 2015 election.

See also 

 Elections in Haiti
 2006 Haitian general election
 2010–11 Haitian general election
 2015–16 Haitian parliamentary election
 2015 Haitian presidential election
 List of political parties in Haiti
 Politics of Haiti

References

External links 
 

Haiti
Haiti
Government agencies established in 1987
Government agencies disestablished in 2021